Bread Line Inc. is a nonprofit organization that seeks "to inspire community collaboration to enrich the lives of our most vulnerable neighbors with nutritious food served with dignity and respect". This organization has sought to accomplish this through a series of programs over 30 plus years of operation.

History
Bread Line, Inc. was initially founded by James and Sharon Hunter.  James and Sharon were residents in Fairbanks, AK that began to notice that many of the locals downtown couldn’t get enough to eat.  They began to try and help their neighbors by making and handing out sandwiches to those in need.  James and Sharon would walk around downtown with backpacks full of sandwiches, but realized there was never enough food.  They began to contact local churches and eventually they were able to set up The Bread Line community meal in the basement of a church.  It is from this community that Bread Line Inc. grew.

Stone Soup Café
The Stone Soup Café is the program that serves breakfast and sack lunches to the people of Fairbanks. The café is located downtown in the heart of Fairbanks and is the main base of operation for Bread Line, Inc.  On average there are at least 7 volunteers that participate daily to help cook, clean, and treat their guests with dignity and respect as in accordance with their mission statement.  Their clientele spans all ages and focuses on a wide range of economically vulnerable groups such as the homeless. This is the oldest program this group runs, having been a part of their operation for thirty-plus years.

Kid’s Café
The Kid’s Café is a once a month program that allows children and their families to help prepare meals for the Stone Soup Café’s clientele. The Kid’s Cafe was first created in an attempt to help facilitate volunteers with children.  In the program children volunteer their time to help cook for the guests and then sit down and have a big meal together.  In the summer time the Kid’s Cafe assists with harvesting at Stone Soup Garden.  This setting also gives children a chance to speak up about the food related injustices, (e.g. food going to waste), they may see and get a potential solution to these problems.

Stone’s Throw
The Stone’s Throw is a culinary education program that has been put on by Bread Line Inc. since March 2015. This twelve-week program is intended to give disadvantaged adults enough of an education to find work in food services. Workplace skills taught by this program include food service industry math, computer literacy, and basic kitchen skills. “Soft” skills such as how to work in a team and interview for a job are also practiced in an effort to maintain employment for graduates. This program has found employment for 85% of their graduates within 30 days of completing the program.

Stone Soup Garden
The Stone Soup Garden is a community garden that was established in May 2015. This was an attempt to provide the Stone Soup Cafe with fresh, locally grown, produce to use in the meals they prepare. The production goal is 2,500 pounds of fresh produce a year to use in more than 25,000 meals the Stone Soup Cafe prepares yearly . The garden beds are in the lot directly behind the Stone Soup Cafe, and maintained through volunteer work.

References

Non-profit organizations based in Alaska